The Garde mobile ("Mobile Guard"; also called Garde nationale mobile though it had nothing to do with the Garde nationale) was intended to be the body which would in effect conscript all who had been able to avoid military service. The Garde would also take in all conscripts on completion of their army service. Napoleon III took up the idea and announced on 12 December 1866 that the Garde Mobile would eventually attain a strength of 400,000 troops. Its members were colloquially known as "Moblots". It origins lay in the crises that led up to the Franco-Prussian War, when Adolphe Niel, Minister of War for France under Emperor Napoleon III, attempted to bolster French military power creating a service which would provide reserves to be added to the regular French army. Although there was conscription into the army, not only was it not universal but middle-class people could purchase exemptions for their sons in a system known as Remplacement.

Both the left and the right in the Corps Legislatif took issue with the proposal. The right wanted an all-professional army; the left were opposed to Bonapartist militarism, or wanted a "People in Arms" as their defense service. Hence not much money was spent for the equipment or training of the Garde Mobile. Its authority to conscript was also diminished. Servicemen were trained fourteen days per year, each one not followed by another, so they could return home to sleep. This service was not even permitted to deploy beyond the local areas of which the units were formed; thus, they were hardly mobile. 

The Garde Mobile had different uniforms from those of either the regular infantry, the National Guard, or the infantry of the French Marines. They did not get the excellent French Chassepot rifle. When the Franco-Prussian War broke out, troops were called up into the Garde Mobile, and they received a mixture of inferior equipment bought from foreign countries, the transport of which was secured by the French Navy.

Representation in Art

Military units and formations of France
French Army
Military units and formations of the Franco-Prussian War